The Kouyou River is a minor river in central Republic of the Congo. Its source is the confluence of several streams. It is a tributary of the Likouala-Mossaka, which in turn feeds into the Congo River.

It is generally a meandering river, but there are rapids near Owando.

Location

See also
List of rivers of the Republic of the Congo

References

Rivers of the Republic of the Congo
Tributaries of the Congo River